El Monstruo is the second full-length album by The Vincent Black Shadow, released on October 27, 2008, by Beef Records.

Track listing

Personnel
The Vincent Black Shadow
 Cassandra Ford – Lead vocals
 Robbie Kirkham – Guitars, keyboards, vocals
 Anthony Kirkham – Drums, percussion
 Chris Kirkham – Bass guitar, vocals

References

The Vincent Black Shadow albums
2008 albums